Lecania sessilisoraliata is a species of saxicolous (rock-dwelling), crustose lichen in the family Ramalinaceae. It is found on rock outcrops in the mountainous Burdur region of Turkey.

Taxonomy

The lichen was formally described as a new species in 2017 by lichenologists André Aptroot and Kenan Yazıcı. The species is only known to occur in Turkey, usually on limestone. The species epithet refers to the characteristic sessile soralia (i.e., vegetative propagules without a stem, stalk, attached to the thallus surface).

Description
The crust thickness is greatest at its centre,  about 1–2 mm. The crust comprises smaller areoles crowded together, each measuring 0.2–0.6 mm in diameter. Whitish soralia are raised above the level of the thallus and are sessile; they are largely crowded towards the thallus centre measuring up to 0.8–1 mm in diameter. The soredia are granular, each measuring 30–50 μm in diameter. The asci contains eight spores and are of the Bacidia-type, with dimensions of 8.5–12 by 25.5–30 μm. Ascospores are hyaline, ellipsoid in shape with a single septum, and measure 8.5–9.8 by 2.4–3.1 μm.

References

Ramalinaceae
Lichen species
Lichens described in 2017
Lichens of Western Asia
Taxa named by André Aptroot